Tucuruí Airport  is the airport serving Tucuruí, Brazil.

It is operated by Esaero.

Airlines and destinations

Access

See also

List of airports in Brazil

References

External links

Airports in Pará